The three-state Potts CFT, also known as the  parafermion CFT, is a conformal field theory in two dimensions. It is a minimal model with central charge . It is considered to be the simplest minimal model with a non-diagonal partition function in Virasoro characters, as well as the simplest non-trivial CFT with the W-algebra as a symmetry.

Properties
These conformal field theories are fully classified and for the most part well-understood.

The modular partition function of the critical three-state Potts model is given by

Here  refers to the Virasoro character, found by taking the trace over the Verma module generated from the Virasoro primary operator labeled by integers . The labeling  is a standard convention for primary operators of the  minimal models.

Furthermore, the critical three-state Potts model is symmetric not only under the Virasoro algebra, but also under an enlarged algebra called the W-algebra that includes the Virasoro algebra as well as some spin-3 currents. Each field in the theory is either a combination of a holomorphic and antiholomorphic W-algebra primary field, or a descendant of such a field generated by acting with W-algebra generators. Some primaries of the Virasoro algebra, such as the  primary, are not primaries of the W algebra.

The partition function is diagonal when expressed in terms of W-algebra characters (where traces are taken over irreducible representations of the W algebra, instead of over irreducible representations of the Virasoro algebra).

The operators  are charged under the action of a global  symmetry. The fusion rules governing the operator product expansions involving these fields respect the action of this  transformation. There is also a charge conjugation symmetry that interchanges .

The critical three-state Potts model is one of the two modularly invariant conformal field theories that exist with central charge . The other such theory is the tetracritical Ising model, which has a diagonal partition function in terms of Virasoro characters. It is possible to obtain the critical three-state Potts model from the tetracritical Ising model by applying a  orbifold transformation to the latter.

Lattice Hamiltonians 
The critical three-state Potts conformal field theory can be realised as the low energy effective theory at the phase transition of the one-dimensional quantum three-state Potts model.

The Hamiltonian of the quantum three-state Potts model is given by 

This Hamiltonian is symmetric under any permutation of the three  eigenstates on each site, as long as the same permutation is done on every site. Thus it is said to have a global  symmetry. A  subgroup of this symmetry is generated by the unitary operator .

In one dimension, the model has two gapped phases, the ordered phase and the disordered phase. The ground state in this phase explicitly breaks the global  symmetry and is thus three-fold degenerate. In other words, in the limit of an infinitely long chain, the lowest energy eigenvalues of the Hamiltonian are spaced infinitesimally close to each other. As is the case for most one dimensional gapless theories, it is possible to describe the low energy physics of the 3-state Potts model using a 1+1 dimensional conformal field theory; in this particular lattice model that conformal field theory is none other than the critical three-state Potts model.

Lattice operator correspondence 

Under the flow of renormalisation group, lattice operators in the quantum three-state Potts model flow to fields in the conformal field theory. In general, understanding which operators flow to what fields is difficult and not obvious. Analytical and numerical arguments suggest a correspondence between a few lattice operators and CFT fields as follows. Lattice indices  map to the corresponding field positions  in space-time, and non-universal real number prefactors are ignored.

 , the -dimensional field composed of holomorphic and anti-holomorphic parts  and 

  . This operator is called the thermal operator, because in the classical statistical mechanics analog of the quantum lattice model, tuning  would be equivalent to changing temperature away from the critical temperature.
 , the dimension-2 stress-energy tensor field.

References

Conformal field theory